Ebersold is a German surname. Notable people with the surname include:

 Frederick Ebersold (1841–1900), American law enforcement officer 
 Tom Ebersold (1943–1976), American enameler

German-language surnames